Bletchley may refer to:

Bletchley, a constituent town of Milton Keynes, in Buckinghamshire, England.
Bletchley, Shropshire

See also
Bletchley Park
The Bletchley Circle (television series)